The following is a discography of the jazz/swing vocal group The Mills Brothers.

Albums
 Famous Barber Shop Ballads Volume One (Decca, 1946)
 Famous Barber Shop Ballads Volume Two (Decca, 1949)
 Souvenir Album (Decca, 1950)
 Wonderful Words (Decca, 1951)
 Meet the Mills Brothers (Decca, 1953)
 Four Boys and a Guitar (Decca, 1954)
 Louis Armstrong and the Mills Brothers (Decca, 1954)
 Singin' and Swingin'  (Decca, 1956)
 Memory Lane (Decca, 1956) 
 One Dozen Roses (Decca, 1957)
 The Mills Brothers in Hi-Fi: Barbershop Ballads (Decca, 1958)
 In a Mellow Tone (Vocalion, 1958)
 Mmmm...The Mills Brothers (Dot, 1958)
 Great Hits (Dot, 1958)
 Sing (London, 1959)
 Merry Christmas (Dot, 1959)
 Greatest Barbershop Hits (Dot, 1959)
 Let Me Call You Sweetheart (Dot, 1959)
 Great Hits (Dot, 1958)
 Glow with the Mills Brothers (Decca, 1959)
 Harmonizin' With (Decca, 1959)
 Barbershop Harmony (Decca, 1960)
 San Antonio Rose (Dot, 1961)
 Yellow Bird (Dot, 1961)
 Great Hawaiian Hits (Dot, 1961)
 Sing Beer Barrel Polka and Other Golden Hits (Dot, 1962)
 The End of the World (Dot, 1963)
 Say Si Si (Dot, 1964)
 Gems by the Mills Brothers (Dot, 1964)
 Sing for You (Hamilton, 1964)
 The Mills Brothers Today! (Dot, 1965)
 The Mills Brothers in Tivoli (Dot, 1966)
 These Are the Mills Brothers (Dot, 1966)
 Anytime! (Pickwick, 1967)
 The Board of Directors with Count Basie (Dot, 1967)
 London Rhythm (Ace of Clubs, 1967)
 The Board of Directors Annual Report with Count Basie (Dot, 1968)
 My Shy Violet (Dot, 1968)
 Fortuosity with Sy Oliver (Dot, 1968)
 Dream a Little Dream of Me (Pickwick, 1968)
 Till We Meet Again (Pickwick, 1968)
 Dream (Dot, 1969)
 The Mills Brothers in Motion (Dot, 1969)
 Cab Driver, Paper Doll, My Shy Violet (Pickwick, 1969)
 No Turnin' Back (Paramount, 1970)
 What a Wonderful World (Paramount, 1972)
 A Donut and a Dream (Paramount, 1972)
 Louis and the Mills Brothers (MCA Coral, 1973)
 Half a Sixpence with Count Basie (Vogue, 1973)
 Opus One (Rediffusion, 1973)
 Cab Driver (Ranwood, 1974)
 Inspiration (ABC Songbird, 1974)
 50th Anniversary (Ranwood, 1976)
 The Mills Brothers (Pickwick, 1976)
 Command Performance! (Ranwood, 1981)
 Copenhagen '81 (51 West, 1981)

Singles

References

External links
 

Discographies of American artists